The Makkal Needhi Maiam (MNM) is an Indian regional political party in the state of Tamil Nadu and union territory of Puducherry. The party was founded by Kamal Haasan at Madurai on 21 February 2018. He also unveiled the party flag. The flag is symbolised by six interlocked hands, meant to represent co-operation between the Southern states of India (5 States and 1 UT). Their election symbol is a battery torchlight.

Makkal Needhi Maiam has also launched a mobile whistleblower application named ‘Maiam Whistle’, open to the public.

This party is estimated to have around 5,500 office bearers at present.

Vice-President 
Dr. Kamal Haasan, the President of the Makkal Needhi Maiam party, appointed Mr. A.G. Mourya IPS (Retd) and Mr. Thangavelu as Vice-President of Makkal Needhi Maiam party in 2021.

State Secretaries list 
Dr. Kamal Haasan announced new executives of Makkal Needhi Maiam party on 26 June 2021.

Electoral performance

Indian general elections

State legislative assembly elections

2019 Lok Sabha Election 
For 2019 Indian general election he declared to contest on 40 seats included 39 of Tamil Nadu and 1 of Puducherry.
Initially, there was speculation that Kamal Haasan could ally with the Congress after the state Congress chief had hinted at it. A few days ago, a lesser known Republican Party of India had forged an alliance with the MNM.

Releasing the party manifesto and the second list of candidates of his Makkal Needhi Maiam or MNM at a function in Coimbatore, Mr Haasan said, "All candidates are my faces. I am proud being the chariot puller than being in the chariot".

Makkal Needhi Maiam's vote share in the 2019 Lok Sabha election was 3.72% (in the seats it contested). Makkal Needhi Maiam secured 1,613,708 votes of the 4,20,83,544 polled in Tamil Nadu. J. Ebenezer, who contested from the Kanyakumari constituency secured the fewest votes at 8,590 while the MNM vice-president Dr. R.Mahendran contesting from the Coimbatore  constituency secured the highest number of votes by the party at 1,45,104. The party performed well in urban areas such as Chennai, Coimbatore and Madurai, where it regularly polled upwards of 8.5% to 12.5% of the vote share and often secured more than one lakh votes, but it performed poorly in rural areas. Despite this, all the candidates lost their deposit.

Makkal Needhi Maiam candidates lost their deposit in all the seats it contested in the 2019 Indian general election but they came third in many urban constituencies through it fell behind the Naam Tamilar Katchi in  several rural constituencies and Amma Makkal Munnettra Kazagam in some constituencies behind  the DMK and AIADMK fronts came first or second in all constituencies.

2021 Tamil Nadu Assembly Election 
On 13 December 2020, Haasan launched MNM's election campaign for the 2021 Tamil Nadu Legislative Assembly election, running candidates in 142 assembly constituencies and committing that he would not form an alliance with either DMK or AIADMK. MNM failed to win any seat in the election, with Haasan himself losing to BJP's Vanathi Srinivasan in the Coimbatore South Assembly constituency by 1728 votes.

References

External links 

 

 
2018 establishments in Tamil Nadu
Centrist parties in India
Political parties established in 2018
Political parties in Puducherry
Political parties in Tamil Nadu